DUFC may refer to:
Dalton United F.C., an association football club in Dalton-in-Furness, England
Dolphins United F.C., an association football club in the Philippines
Dookie United Football Club, an Australian rules football club
Drogheda United F.C., an association football club in Drogheda, Ireland
Dublin University Fencing Club, a fencing club in Dublin, Ireland
Dublin University Football Club, a rugby union club in Dublin, Ireland
Dundee United F.C., an association football club in Dundee, Scotland